Chloroclystis thermastobrita is a moth in the family Geometridae. It was described by David Stephen Fletcher in 1958. It is found in Tanzania.

References

External links

Moths described in 1958
thermastobrita